Traverso DAW is a cross-platform multitrack audio recording and audio editing suite with support for CD mastering and non-linear processing. It is free software, licensed under GNU General Public License.

Traverso offers a unique user interface using both the mouse and the keyboard together for precision and speed. 
Designed for scalability, Traverso DAW can be used by live musicians using a netbook.

Development Status 
Traverso DAW 0.49.5 was released on October 16th 2017, having been ported to Qt 5. The official project page has been in a minimal form since a point in time after July 2014.

See also 

 List of music software

References

External links 
Traverso DAW homepage

Digital audio workstation software
Windows multimedia software
MacOS multimedia software
Audio editing software that uses Qt